Prairie County is the name of two counties in the United States:

 Prairie County, Arkansas
 Prairie County, Montana